Paul is a concelho (municipality) of Cape Verde. Situated in the northeastern part of the island of Santo Antão, it covers 7% of the island area (54.3 km2), and is home to 16% of its population (6,997 at the 2010 census). Its seat is the town Pombas.

The municipality and parish
The municipality consists of one freguesia (civil parish), Santo António das Pombas. The freguesia is subdivided into the following settlements (population at the 2010 census):

Cabo da Ribeira (pop: 912)
Campo de Cão (pop: 787)
Eito (pop: 979)
Figueiral (pop: 591)
Janela (pop: 1,658)
Pico da Cruz (pop: 138)
Pombas (pop: 1,295, city)
Ribeira das Pombas (pop: 411)
Ribeirãozinho (pop: 27)
Santa Isabel (pop: 186)

Demography

Geography
The municipality has a rugged landscape, defined by the mountain valleys of the rivers Ribeira do Paul, Ribeira das Pombas, Ribeira de Gil, Ribeira da Janela, Ribeira do Penedo and Ribeira da Aguada. Its southwesternmost point is formed by the Cova Caldera. Its highest point is Pico da Cruz, at 1585 m elevation. The Cova-Paul-Ribeira da Torre Natural Park lies partly in the municipality of Paul. The national roads EN1-SA02 and EN1-SA03 connect Pombas with Ribeira Grande and Porto Novo, respectively.

History
In 1867 the municipalities of Paul (covering the area of current Paul and Porto Novo) and Ribeira Grande were created from the previous municipality that covered the whole island of Santo Antão. These were merged in 1895 into one municipality, and recreated in 1917. In 1962 the municipality of Paul received its current borders, when the new municipality of Porto Novo was created.

Notable people
Antoninho Travadinha, commonly known as Travadinha, an autodidactic musician

Politics
Since 2012, the Movement for Democracy (MpD) is the ruling party of the municipality. The results of the latest elections, in 2016:

Sister cities

Paul has five sister municipalities, all of them are in Portugal: Almodôvar, Benavente, Gavião, Odivelas and Sernancelhe.

References

External links

 ANMCV (Associação Nacional dos Municípios Cabo-Verdianos - National Association of the Capeverdean Municipalities)
 Official Paul Tourism Website by Municipal Council of Paul

 
Municipalities of Cape Verde
Geography of Santo Antão, Cape Verde
Cova-Paul-Ribeira da Torre Natural Park
1971 establishments in Cape Verde